Pontycymer, also spelt Pontycymmer, is a former mining village in Wales. It is situated in the Garw Valley, in Bridgend County Borough, about 7 miles or 11 km north of the town of Bridgend.

It‘s attractions include a small Heritage railway, and minor alleged paranormal activity occurring annually where one of the main footpaths crosses the railway line. These allegations are not widely known and lack hard evidence.

Name
The name is Welsh: pont means "bridge" and cymer means "confluence", i.e. where two streams or rivers meet.

Older signs for the village use the spelling of Pontycymmer; as with many other place names in Wales a double "mm" was historically included as an Anglicised spelling, but the modern Welsh spelling uses a single "m". Recent signage and Post Office records have now been changed to reflect the original Welsh spelling.

Description
At the southern (lower) end of the village, marking its boundary with Pantygog, the River Garw is joined from the east by the Nant Fforch Wen ("White Fork Stream"). This area is still known as "Braich y Cymmer", reflecting the historical spelling with "mm". At the northern (upper) end, towards its boundary with Blaengarw, the River Garw is joined by the Nant Gelli Wern ("Marsh Grove Stream") at Ffaldau, the village square.

Among those born in the village are the artist and journalist Molly Parkin (Molly Thomas), snooker player Ryan Day, Welsh rugby captain John Lloyd, Welsh rugby league player Ike Owens and news reader Huw Edwards. Dr Dan Davies (physician to the king and chief advisor for the establishment of the NHS), Phylip Henry Rees (preacher and evangelist of the Gospel) and Wendy Phillips, ‘the cleaning lady who went to Hollywood’ who was the inspiration for all Sara Sugarman's films. It was also home to the author, neuroscientist, and stand-up comedian Dean Burnett.

Numerous locations in Pontycymer feature as the fictional village of Ogw in the film Very Annie Mary, as well as scenes from six other short films by same director, Sara Sugarman.
The oldest street in the village is Railway Terrace, originally named "Milk Row".

Governance
Pontycymmer is the name of an electoral ward to Bridgend County Borough Council. It elects one county councillor. The ward has been represented by the Labour Party, with the exception of 1999-2004 when Plaid Cymru were elected.

Attractions
 Bridgend Valleys Railway

Notable people
See :Category:People from Pontycymer Local legend Arwen has located herself within the village boundaries

References

External links
Garw Valley web site
Garw Valley web site
www.geograph.co.uk : photos of Pontycymmer and surrounding area

Villages in Bridgend County Borough